SVGAlib was an open-source low-level graphics library which ran on Linux and FreeBSD and allowed programs to change video mode and display full-screen graphics, without the use of a windowing system. Some popular games like Quake and Doom have been ported to use SVGAlib.

History
The first version of SVGALib was based on version 1.2 of another library, VGALib.

SVGALib was popular in the mid-1990s. Toward 2000, many applications that used it migrated to X11 and SDL, which could (until SDL 2.0) make use of SVGAlib as a video driver.

References

External links
 SVGAlib
 Development versions (link on the site itself is broken)

Articles with example C code
Free computer libraries
Graphics libraries